Zeh-e Kalut (also Romanized as Zeh-e Kalūt) is a city in Jazmurian Rural District, Jazmurian District, Rudbar-e Jonubi County, Kerman Province, Iran. At the 2006 census, its population was 2,556, in 534 families.

References 

Populated places in Rudbar-e Jonubi County
Cities in Kerman Province